is a Japanese politician of the Liberal Democratic Party, a member of the House of Representatives in the Diet (national legislature). A native of Hiki District, Saitama and graduate of Nihon University, he was elected to the House of Representatives for the first time in 1996.

References

External links
 Official website in Japanese.

|-

|-

Living people
1948 births
Liberal Democratic Party (Japan) politicians
Members of the House of Representatives (Japan)
Nihon University alumni
21st-century Japanese politicians